Izman-e Pa'in (also Romanized as Īzmān-e Pā’īn; also known as Īzmān-e Soflá) is a village in Gifan Rural District, Garmkhan District, Bojnord County, North Khorasan Province, Iran. At the 2006 census, its population was 453, in 94 families.

References 

Populated places in Bojnord County